Il Tre is an Italian rapper. He is mostly known for his album Ali - Per chi non ha un posto in questo mondo that debuted at the top of the FIMI leaderboards.

Career

Early years (2015-2018) 
His career began in the 2010s, with his first work "Cataclisma", published on YouTube in 2015, but a particular turning point turned when he reached the success of the One Shot Game contest in 2016, surpassing the competition of hundreds of other artists. In 2018 he published the mixtape "Cracovia Vol. 2" from total independent, and despite this he managed to conquer in less than a week over 50 thousand downloads and 1 million streams, also running out of physical copies.

Signing for Atlantic (2018-2019) 
His first official single, "Bella Guido", was released in June of the same year and immediately went in the "Top Viral" leaderboard on Spotify. He therefore began to acquire more popularity thanks to the YouTube Real Talk format, whose video exceeded 3 million views. These results lead him to sign for Atlantic / Warner Music Italy, his new single is "L’importante" produced by Ill Bosca, from Real Talk. with Atlantic he recorded singles such as "Cracovia Pt. 3" (Gold certified), "Le vostre madri", "Fight" ft Nayt and "Te lo prometto" (Platinum certified). He also appears in the "Ricercato" album by Junior Cally in the track "Cristiano".

Ali (2020-2021) 
On February 19, 2021, he released his debut studio album Ali - Per chi non ha un posto in questo mondo, anticipated by the single "Pioggia". After just 1 week by its release,  the album makes its debut at the top of the ranking of the best-selling albums of the week, created by the FIMI (Italian Music Industry Federation).

Discography

Studio albums 
 Ali - Per chi non ha un posto in questo mondo (2021)

Mixtapes 
 Cataclisma (2015)
 Cracovia (2016)
 Cracovia Vol. 2 (2018)
 Cracovia Vol. 3 (2021)

Singles

References 

Canale twitch: https://www.twitch.tv/IlTreOfficialTv

1997 births
Italian rappers
Living people